West Somerset or Somerset Western (formally The Western division of Somerset) was the name of a parliamentary constituency in the county of Somerset between 1832 and 1885. It returned two Members of Parliament to the House of Commons of the Parliament of the United Kingdom, elected by the bloc vote system.

Boundaries

1832–1868
1832–1868: The Hundreds of Abdick and Bulstone, Andersfield, Cannington, Carhampton, Crewkerne, North Curry, Houndsborough, Berwick and Coker, Huntspill and Puriton, Kingsbury East, Kingsbury West, Martock, Milverton, North Petherton, South Petherton, Pitney, Somerton, Stone, Taunton and Taunton Dean, Tintinhull, Whitley, and Williton and Freemanors.

The constituency was created for the 1832 general election, when the former Somerset constituency was divided into new East and West divisions. It also absorbed the voters from the abolished boroughs of Ilchester and Minehead. The constituency might have been better described as South-Western Somerset, since it stretched to the southern as well as the western extremities of the county. It surrounded the county town of Taunton (although Taunton was a borough electing MPs in its own right, freeholders within the borough who met the property-owning qualifications for the county franchise could vote in West Somerset as well, as could those in Bridgwater); otherwise, the largest town was Yeovil, but the division also included Chard, Crewkerne, Minehead, Wellington, Ilminster, Street, Watchet and Wiveliscombe; nevertheless, the majority of voters were in the rural areas.

1868–1885
The Second Reform Act changed the limits greatly for the 1868 general election. It gave the county a third division, Mid Somerset into which were moved the eastern end of this seat (including Yeovil, Street and Crewkerne).

The West gained a new main town, Bridgwater, its seats abolished partly for corruption.

Abolition
The constituency was abolished for the 1885 general election, when those parts of Somerset outside its boroughs were divided into seven single-member county constituencies. West Somerset's voters were divided between the new Bridgwater, South Somerset and Wellington divisions. (The Wellington division, which lasted until 1918, had the alternative name of Western Somerset.)

Members of Parliament

Notes

Election Results

Elections in the 1830s

Elections in the 1840s

 12321

Elections in the 1850s
Hood's death caused a by-election.

Elections in the 1860s
Moody's resignation caused a by-election.

Elections in the 1870s
Langton's death caused a by-election.

Elections in the 1880s

Lee resigned, causing a by-election.

Bisset resigned, causing a by-election.

References
F W S Craig, British Parliamentary Election Results 1832-1885 (2nd edition, Aldershot: Parliamentary Research Services, 1989)
 Frederic A Youngs, jr, Guide to the Local Administrative Units of England, Vol I (London: Royal Historical Society, 1979)

Parliamentary constituencies in Somerset (historic)
Constituencies of the Parliament of the United Kingdom established in 1832
Constituencies of the Parliament of the United Kingdom disestablished in 1885